Pound cake is a type of cake made using flour, butter, eggs and sugar.

Pound Cake or Poundcake(s) may also refer to:
 Pound Cake speech, a speech made by Bill Cosby
 "Pound Cake / Paris Morton Music 2", a song by Drake
 Pound Cake (My Little Pony), a My Little Pony character
 "Poundcake", a song by Van Halen
 Poundcake (album), an album by Alaska Thunderfuck
 Poundcakes (Marvel Comics), a comic book supervillainess